Mónica Edith Litza is an Argentine politician currently serving as a National Deputy elected in Buenos Aires Province. Litza previously held the position from 2016 to 2017. She was a member of the Senate of Buenos Aires from 2003 to 2007 and of the Avellaneda City Council from 2015 to 2019.

Formerly a member of the Justicialist Party, Litza was one of the founding members of the Renewal Front, a dissident peronist alliance formed by Sergio Massa. In addition to her elected posts, she has also served as head of the National Directorate for Recidivism from 2008 to 2013, and as Vice President of Correo Argentino from 2019 to 2021.

Early life and education
Litza was born on 2 April 1961 in Avellaneda, a port city in the Greater Buenos Aires conurbation. She studied law at the Universidad de Belgrano, and counts with a doctorate on Political Science from the Pontifical Catholic University of Argentina (UCA).

Political career
In 2003, Litza was elected to the Senate of Buenos Aires Province as part of the Justicialist Party list in the Third Electoral Section. In 2008, she was appointed as head of the National Directorate for Recidivism, an agency within the Ministry of Justice and Human Rights of Argentina.

Ahead of the 2013 legislative election, Litza broke away from the Justicialist Party and joined the Renewal Front, led by Sergio Massa. She ran for a seat in the Chamber of Deputies in Buenos Aires Province as the 18th candidate in the Renewal Front list, which was the most voted list in the province, with 43.95% of the popular vote, but still did not receive enough votes for Litza to make it past the D'Hondt cut. 

In 2015, she ran for and won a seat in the Avellaneda City Council as part of the Renewal Front list. In March 2016, PRO deputy Christian Gribaudo (who had run in the Renewal Front list in 2013) resigned from his seat to take up a post in the Buenos Aires provincial government, and Litza filled in his vacancy.

She initially intended to run for mayor of Avellaneda in the 2019 election, but later declined her candidacy when the Renewal Front joined other sectors of Peronism in forming the Frente de Todos (FDT), which backed the re-election campaign of incumbent Jorge Ferraresi. In January 2020, she was appointed Vice President of Correo Argentino.

In the 2021 legislative election, Litza once again ran for a seat in the Chamber of Deputies, now as the 11th candidate in the FDT list. With 38.59% of the vote, the FDT received enough votes for Litza to be elected. She was sworn in on 7 December 2021.

Electoral history

References

External links

1961 births
Living people
People from Avellaneda
Buenos Aires Province politicians
Justicialist Party politicians
Renewal Front politicians
21st-century Argentine politicians
Members of the Argentine Chamber of Deputies elected in Buenos Aires Province
Women members of the Argentine Chamber of Deputies
Members of the Buenos Aires Province Senate
Pontifical Catholic University of Argentina alumni
21st-century Argentine women politicians
University of Belgrano alumni